Halocella is a Gram-negative, non-spore-forming, obligately anaerobic and moderately halophilic genus of bacteria from the family of Halanaerobiaceae with one known species (Halocella cellulosilytica). Halocella cellulosilytica has been isolated from the hypersaline lagoon of the Lake Syvash on the Crimea.

See also
 List of bacterial orders
 List of bacteria genera

References

Clostridia
Bacteria genera
Taxa described in 1994
Monotypic bacteria genera